Murphy Brown is an American television sitcom created by Diane English and produced by Shukovsky English Entertainment and Warner Bros. Television. The series revolves around the titular character (Candice Bergen), a famous investigative journalist and news anchor for FYI, a fictional CBS television news series. Murphy Brown aired on CBS from November 14, 1988 to May 18, 1998, broadcasting 247 episodes over ten seasons during its initial run.

During the series' run, Murphy Brown received nominations for a variety of industry awards, including 62 Emmy awards (with 18 wins), 15 Golden Globe awards (with three wins), three Screen Actors Guild awards, 4 TCA awards (with two wins), 5 Directors Guild of America awards (with two wins) and 4 Writers Guild of America awards (with two wins). 

Candice Bergen, for her portrayal of Murphy Brown, received the most individual awards and nominations, winning five Emmy Awards and a Golden Globe award. Several other actors and crew members in the series received many awards and nominations, including Faith Ford, Grant Shaud, Jay Thomas, Barnet Kellman and Tucker Wiard.

Awards and nominations

American Comedy Awards
The American Comedy Award is an annual accolade created by George Schlatter in recognition of excellence in the field of comedy, most notably in film and television. Out of 7 nominations, Murphy Brown won an award for Funniest Female Performer in a TV Series (Leading Role) Network, Cable or Syndication, awarded to Candice Bergen.

Artios Awards
Presented by the Casting Society of America since 1985, the Artios Awards is an annual accolade that honors excellence in casting. Murphy Brown received seven nominations for the award for Best Casting for TV, Comedic Episodic during its tenure. The series won twice in 1989 and 1990.

BMI Film & TV Awards

Directors Guild of America Awards

Presented by the Directors Guild of America since 1938, The Directors Guild of America Award honors excellence in the field of direction. Murphy Brown received five nominations for the award for Outstanding Directorial Achievement in Comedy Series, three out of five for work by Barnet Kellman and the rest for work by Peter Bonerz. Both directors each won an award for the series.

Emmy Awards

Murphy Brown received 62 Primetime Emmy Award nominations, with 18 wins — 15 Primetime and three Creative Arts. The series received five nominations for the award for Outstanding Comedy Series, winning twice in 1990 and 1992. Candice Bergen won the award for Outstanding Lead Actress in a Comedy Series five times, a record she shares with Julia Louis-Dreyfus and Mary Tyler Moore, and received two further nominations in 1991 and 1993. Murphy Brown received a number of nominations for guest performance awards. In the Outstanding Guest Actress in a Comedy Series category, Colleen Dewhurst won the award in 1989 and 1991. Jay Thomas won the Outstanding Guest Actor in a Comedy Series twice in 1990 and 1991 while Martin Sheen won the award in 1994. The series won the award for Outstanding Writing for a Comedy Series twice in 1989 and 1991 as well as the award for Outstanding Directing for a Comedy Series in 1992. The series won two Creative Arts Emmy Awards for Outstanding Editing for a Series – Multi-Camera Production for work by Tucker Wiard.

Primetime Emmy Awards

Creative Arts Emmy Awards

Golden Globe Awards

Murphy Brown received fifteen Golden Globe Award nominations during its tenure, with two wins for Best Actress – Television Series Musical or Comedy for Candice Bergen and one win for Best Television Series – Musical or Comedy.

Online Film & Television Association Awards

Q Awards
The Q Award, presented by the Viewers for Quality Television, honors programs and performers that the organization deem are of the highest quality. Out of 32 nominations, Murphy Brown won six awards, including Best Quality Comedy Series in 1991; Best Actress in a Quality Comedy Series for Candice Bergen three times from 1989 to 1991; Best Specialty Player for Scott Bakula in 1994; and Best Writing in a Quality Comedy Series in 1991.

Screen Actors Guild Awards
Murphy Brown received three Screen Actors Guild Award nominations, two for Outstanding Performance by a Female Actor in a Comedy Series for Candice Bergen and one for Outstanding Performance by an Ensemble in a Comedy Series for the cast.

Television Critics Association Awards
During its tenure, Murphy Brown received four TCA Award nominations for Outstanding Achievement in Comedy, winning twice.

TV Land Awards
The TV Land Award is an award presented at the eponymous award ceremony, airing on TV Land, that honors television programs that are off air. Receiving five nominations since the first award ceremony, Murphy Brown won an award for TV Moment That Became Headline News.

Writers Guild of America Awards
Presented by the Writers Guild of America (WGA), the Writers Guild of America Award is an annual accolade that recognizes outstanding achievement of writers in film, television, radio, promotional writing and videogames. Murphy Brown received 4 nominations of for the award for Television: Episodic Comedy, winning twice in 1991 and 1993.

Other awards

References

External links
 List of Primetime Emmy Awards received by Murphy Brown
 List of awards and nominations received by Murphy Brown at the Internet Movie Database

Murphy Brown